Kharfaq is a small village with a population of about 2,000 people in Ghanche District, Gilgit-Baltistan, Pakistan. The village is located 3 hours away from Kharfaq Lake, a lake famous for its large trout population.

Geography 
Khaplu, which is Ghanche District's administrative capital, is 24 km away. The average altitude of the area is around 4600m above sea level. The main attraction of the area is beautiful valleys, wild animals, lakes and rare birds. The village is located 3 hours away from Kharfaq Lake, a lake famous for its large trout population. The village is located on the Shyok River.

Language
Balti, a Tibetic language, is spoken in Kharfaq and adjoining parts of Ladakh. It is mutually intelligible with the Ladakhi language and the Purgi language. Many of the written consonants that are silent in Standard Tibetan are pronounced in the Balti language.

Gallery

Populated places in Ghanche District
Villages in Pakistan